Detroit Dam is a gravity dam on the North Santiam River between Linn County and Marion County, Oregon. It was constructed between 1949 and 1953 by the United States Army Corps of Engineers.

It is one of the dams authorized by the Flood Control Act of 1938.  Construction was delayed largely due to World War II.  The dam, dedicated on June 10, 1953, was authorized for the purposes of flood control, power generation, navigation, and irrigation. Other uses are fishery, water quality, and recreation. It was built in concert with the Big Cliff Dam downstream.

In 2021, the U.S. Army Corps of Engineers determined that this dam was at risk of failing in a large earthquake in the Cascadia subduction zone, which would result in a "potentially catastrophic flood", which could potentially affect Oregon's state capital, Salem, located downstream. For this reason, the level of the reservoir was lowered by five feet, to reduce the stress on the concrete structure.

Capacity

 Drainage area: 437 mi² (1,132 km²)
 Maximum inflow: 63,200 ft³/s (1,790 m³/s) 1909
 Lake Elevation
 Maximum pool: 1,574 ft (480 m)
 Full pool: 1,569 ft (478 m)
 Minimum flood control pool: 1,450 ft (442 m)
 Usable storage (1,425.0 to 1,563.5 ft) = 
 Powerhouse
 Number of units: 2 
 Nameplate capacity: 100 MW 
 Overload capacity: 115 MW 
 Hydraulic capacity: 5,340 ft³/s (151 m³/s)

References

External links

 Corps of Engineers plots of lake level and flow for various intervals up to a year

Dams in Oregon
Hydroelectric power plants in Oregon
Buildings and structures in Linn County, Oregon
Buildings and structures in Marion County, Oregon
United States Army Corps of Engineers dams
Dams completed in 1953
Energy infrastructure completed in 1953
1953 establishments in Oregon
Gravity dams